Beat Out! (typeset as BEAT out!) is the third album by Japanese rock/pop band Glay. It was released on February 7, 1996, and peaked at #1 at Oricon charts, with 821,890 copies sold. It was named one of the top albums from 1989–1998 in a 2004 issue of the music magazine Band Yarouze.

Track listing 
 "More Than Love" - 4:47
 "Yes, Summerdays" - 5:10
 "" - 4:19
 "Trouble On Monday" - 5:28
 "Together" - 7:02
 "" - 4:19
 "" - 3:49
 "" - 5:57
 "" - 4:55
 "" - 5:34
 "Miki Piano" - 5:14

References 

 Speed Pop page at Oricon

External links 
 Glay Official Site

1996 albums
Glay albums